Heman G. Button (May 1, 1816 – September 18, 1894) was an American farmer and politician from New York

Life 
Button was born on May 1, 1816 in Concord, New York, the son of Charles Button. The family moved to Machias, then part of Ischua, in 1817.

Button was a farmer, although he also taught in school in the winter for 14 years. He was town superintendent of common schools from 1843 to 1847, Justice of the Peace from 1851 to 1863, Justice of Sessions in 1852, Town Supervisor in 1854 and 1866, and Superintendent of the Poor from 1846 to 1850 and from 1858 to 1863. He was also Inspector of Schools and Elections, Assessor and Highway Commissioner, and held a number of town and county offices for decades. He also served as loan commissioner for seven years, a notary public, and railroad commissioner for the town. He was a trustee of the Ten Broeck Free Academy.

Button was originally a Whig, but he joined the Republican Party immediately after it was formed. In 1866, he was elected to the New York State Assembly as a Republican, representing the Cattaraugus County 1st District. He served in the Assembly in 1867.

In 1838, Button married Jerusha Joslin. Their seven children were Daniel W., Kingsley, Millard Fillmore, Naomi, Alvira L., Adell, and Ida. Jerusha died in 1856, and later that year Button married widow Sarah M. Hall.

Button died on September 18, 1894. He was buried in Maple Grove Cemetery in Machias.

References

External links 

 The Political Graveyard
 Heman G. Button at Find a Grave

1816 births
1894 deaths
People from Cattaraugus County, New York
Farmers from New York (state)
Town supervisors in New York (state)
American justices of the peace
New York (state) Whigs
New York (state) Republicans
19th-century American politicians
Members of the New York State Assembly
Burials in New York (state)